This is the list of licensed foreign exchange bureaus in Uganda:

https://t.me/ShaneBinaryandForextry/12

 Abedis Forex Bureau - Garden City, Ground Floor, Yusuf Lule Road, Kampala
 Access Forex Bureau 1A - Muyenga Road, Kabalagala, Kampala
 Access Forex Bureau 1B - Shop#12, Krish Mall, Old Portbell Road, Bugoloobi, Kampala
 Ace Forex Bureau - Arrivals Lounge, Entebbe International Airport, Entebbe
 Advanta Forex Bureau - 1 Dewinton Road, Kampala
 African Express Forex Bureau - 83B Mukwano Arcade, Ben Kiwanuka Street, Kampala
 Alpha Capital Partners Forex Bureau - Cham Towers, Shop# 17, 12 Kampala Road, Kampala
 Already Forex Bureau - 11 Luwum Street, Kampala
 Amal Forex Bureau 1A - Tropical Complex, 18 Ben Kiwanuka Street, Kampala
 Amal Forex Bureau 1B - 1 Central Lane, Arua
 Amin Forex Bureau - Arua Park Plaza, 78 Ben Kiwanuka Street, Kampala
 Annex Forex Bureau - Rooms B3 & B4, Sun City Plaza, 17 Wilson Road, Kampala
 Arrow Forex Bureau -  6 Bombo Road, Kampala
 Arua Forex Bureau - 7 Adumi Road, Arua
 Asante Forex Bureau - Shop#4,  18, Mariam Nabusi Arcade, Nabugabo Road, Kampala
 Audex Forex Bureau - Shop#L4-441, Galiraaya Commercial Plaza, 24 William Street, Kampala
 B.M. Forex Bureau - Uganda House, 8-10 Kampala Road, Kampala
 Bakaal Express Money Transfer Services Limited 1A - Tropical Complex, 82 Ben Kiwanuka Street, Kampala
 Bakaal Express Money Transfer Services Limited 1B - 11 Malinga Road, Mengo, Kisenyi, Kampala.
 Best Forex Bureau - Shops 1&2, 3 William Street, Kampala
 Best Buy Forex Bureau - Premier Arcade, 43-47 Nabugabo Road, Kampala
 Best Rates Forex Bureau - 36-38 Ntinda Road, Kampala
 Biashara Forex Bureau - 12 Johnstone Street, Kampala
 Bicco Forex Bureau 1 - 1 Colville Street, Kampala
 Bicco Forex Bureau 2 - Ediruma Building, 67 Main Street, Jinja
 Big Bills Forex Bureau - The Prism Building, Ground Floor, Room A-O9, 71-73 Kampala Road, Kampala
 Bio's Forex Bureau - Tank Hill Parade Building, Room# 12, 2863 Tank Hill Road, Kampala
 Bonus Forex Bureau - 930 Ggaba Road, Kampala
 Buddu Forex Bureau - Gazaland Plaza, 22A William Street, Kampala
 Capital Forex Bureau - Shop#2, 56 Muyenga Road, Kabalagala, Kampala
 Cash Connect Forex Bureau - Shop#A01, Abamwe House, 26-27 Nabugabo Road, Kampala
 Cashmart Forex Bureau - Crested Towers, 17 Hannington Road, Kampala
 Cash Money Forex Bureau - Shop#3, Sunset Arcade. 3 Wilson Road, Kampala
 City Forex Bureau - 22 Mukwano Shopping Arcade, Luwum Street, Kampala
 City Forex Bureau 1A - 4010 Freedom City Mall, Suite#A7, Namasuba, Wakiso District
 City Bureau De Change 1A - 4 Parliament Avenue, Kampala
 City Bureau De Change 1B - Namaganda House, 14 Luwum Street, Kampala
 Civic Forex Bureau - Nandee Towers, Shop#1, 12 Wilson Road, Kampala
 Clyde Forex Bureau - 18 Clive Road, Jinja
 Combined Forex Bureau 1A - 4 Kimathi Avenue, Kampala
 Combined Forex Bureau 1B - Plot 5277, Block 254, Kansanga, Kampala
 Combined Forex Bureau 1C - Mbogo Road, Plot 7469 Kisugu Zone, Kabalagala, Kampala
 Comdel Forex Bureau - Kamu Kamu Plaza, Suite#GF:216, 6 Entebbe Road, Kampala
 Commonwealth Finance Solutions - 9 Lower Kololo Terrace, Kololo, Kampala
 Cosmopolitan Forex Bureau Ltd - P.O Box 28200, Kampala
 Crane Forex Bureau 1 - 20 Kampala Road, Kampala
 Crane Forex Bureau 2 - Kampala Speke Hotel, 7-9 Nile Avenue, Kampala
 Crown Forex Bureau - Clanson Building, 1 Entebbe Road, Kampala
 Currency Care Forex Bureau 1 - Kalungi Plaza, 16-18 William Street, Kampala
 Currency Care Forex Bureau 1A - King Fahd Plaza, 52 Kampala Road, Kampala 
 Dahabshiil Forex Bureau 1 - 52 Kampala Road, Kampala
 Dahabshiil Forex Bureau 2 - 3 Transport Road, Arua
 Dahabshiil Forex Bureau 3 - 74A, Road, Kampala
 Dahabshiil Forex Bureau 4 - 22 Kibuga Road, Kisenyi, Kampala
 Dakar Forex Bureau - 16-18 Duster Street, Kampala
 Davinnette Forex Bureau - Shop#4 Grand Imperial Hotel Shopping Mall, 6A Nile Avenue, Kampala 
 Demo Forex Bureau - 19 Lugard Road, Fort Portal
 Dibs Forex Bureau - Atlanta House, Shop#AB05, 5 Nakivubo Mews, Kampala
 Divine Cash Forex Bureau - Kalungi Commercial Plaza, 48 Kampala Road, Kampala
 Dollar House Forex Bureau 1 - Shop#29, King Fahd Plaza, 52 Kampala Road, Kampala
 Dollar House Forex Bureau 2 - Shop#18, King Fahd Plaza, 52 Kampala Road, Kampala
 Dollar House Forex Bureau 3 - Shop#4, King Fahd Plaza, 52 Kampala Road, Kampala
 Dominion Forex Bureau - 10 Nakivubo Mews, Kampala
 Downtown Forex Bureau - 54-55 Kampala Road, Kampala
 Dual Forex Bureau - Majestic Plaza, 22 William Street, Kampala
 Easy Change Forex Bureau - Faibaah Plaza, 23 Luwum Street, Kampala
 Economic Exchange Forex Bureau 1A - 69A Kampala Road, Kampala
 Economic Exchange Forex Bureau 1B - Sun City Arcade, 46 William Street, Kampala
 Entebbe Forex Bureau - 1B Kitoro Road, Entebbe
 Elba Forex Bureau - Transnile Building, Level#05, Shop#07, 10 Johnstone Street, Kampala
 Express Forex Bureau - 54 Kampala Road, Kampala
 Fair Price Forex Bureau - 153 Kisenyi Road, Kisenyi, Kampala
 Fang Fang International Bureau - Fang Fang Hotel, 9 Ssezibwa Road, Nakasero, Kampala
 Fin Finee Forex Bureau - 17B Apollo House, Kampala
 Flood Gates Forex Bureau - 479 Masaka Road, Ndeeba, Kampala
 Forex Bureau 2000 - 2 Mackay Road, Kampala
 Friends Forex Bureau 1A - Shop#B05 Mabiriizi Complex, 47 Kampala Road, Kampala
 Friends Forex Bureau 1B - 8 Johnstone Street, Kampala
 Galaxy Forex Bureau - King Fahd Plaza, 52 Kampala Road, Kampala
 Gai Exchange Bureau - Jesco Plaza, Shop#CB6, 10 Wilson Road, Kampala
 Glory Forex Bureau - Superior Shopping Complex, 12 Johnstone Street, Kampala
 Golden Bag Forex Bureau - Jesco Plaza, Room#CB11, 10 Wilson Road, Kampala
 Harbek Forex Bureau -  Mulima Mayuuni Arcade, 9 Kikuubo Lane, Kampala 
 Hare Krishna Forex Bureau - 15 Nabugabo Road, Kampala
 Harvan Forex Bureau - Shop#F1, Namaganda Plaza, 12 William Street, Kampala
 Hedge Forex Bureau - Ham Tower, Ground Floor, Room#B10, 923 Makerere Hill Road, Kampala
 Highland Hotel Forex Bureau - 1 Kazooba Road, Kabale
 HJS Forex Bureau - Mutaasa Kafeero Plaza, 7 Burton Street, Kampala
 Honest Forex Bureau - Jesco Plaza, 10 Wilson Road, Kampala
 Hotel Africana Forex Bureau 1 - 2-4 Wampewo Avenue, Kampala
 Hotel Africana Forex Bureau 2 - 16-18 William Street, Kampala
 Hydery Forex Bureau 1 - 16 Wilson Road, Kampala
 Hydery Forex Bureau 2 - 48-50 Ben Kiwanuka Street, Kampala
 Hydery Forex Bureau 3 - 32 William Street, Kampala
 Idaa Forex Bureau - 30, Awich Road, Gulu
 Iftiin Forex Bureau - Prime Shopping Complex, 6 Wilson Road, Kampala
 Industrial Graphics Forex Bureau - 23-25 Kampala Road, Entebbe
 Interlink Forex Bureau - 31 Iganga Road, Jinja
 J.Supi Forex Bureau 1A - Mabiriizi Complex, 47 Kampala Road, Kampala
 J.Supi Faorex Bureau 1B - Jjemba Plaza, Room#K103, Luwum Street, Kampala
 Jabez Forex Bureau - 103B Kampala Road, Entebbe
 Jaffrey Forex Bureau 1A - Capital House Building, 68 Ben Kiwanuka Street, Kampala
 Jaffrey Forex Bureau 1B - The Prizm Plaza, Basement Floor, 71-73 Kampala Road, Kampala
 Jama Forex Bureau - 148 Malinga Road, Kisenyi, Kampala
 Jasco Forex Bureau - Nana Centre Building, 43-47 Nakivubo Road, Kampala
 Jet Set Forex Bureau 1 - Departures Lounge, Entebbe International Airport, Entebbe
 Jet Set Forex Bureau 2 - 16 Kampala Road, Entebbe Town
 Jet Set Forex Bureau 3 - 1 Atwal Road, Gulu
 Jet Set Forex Bureau 4 - 2218 Ggaba Road, Kabalagala, Kampala
 Jet Set Forex Bureau 5 - 3 Kimathi Avenue, Kampala
 Jet Set Forex bureau 6 - Arrivals Lounge, Entebbe International Airport, Entebbe
 Jet Set Forex Bureau 7 - Tuskys Supermarket, Kira Road, Ntinda, Kampala
 Jet Set Forex Bureau 8 - Tuskys Supermarket, Commercial Building, 20-24 Spring Road, Bugoloobi, Kampala
 Joex Forex Bureau - Plot 8A, Namirembe Road, KK Trust plaza/Hotel
 Josca Forex Bureau - 27 Kampala Road, Abayita Ababiri, Entebbe
 Kamwe Forex Bureau 1A -  Shop#GF11, Forest Mall, 3A2 & 3A3 Sports Lane, Lugogo, Kampala
 Kamwe Forex Bureau 1B - Freedom City Shopping Mall, 4010 Entebbe Road, Namasuba, Wakiso District
 Karibu Forex Bureau - Shop#CG10, Mukwano Arcade, Namirembe Road, Kampala
 Kikuubo Lane Forex Bureau - Mulima Mayuuni House, 9 Nakivubo Road, Kampala
 Klyn-Cash Forex Bureau 1 - Mukwano Arcade, 7 Sikh Road, Kampala
 Klyn-Cash Forex Bureau 2 - UAP Insurance Building, 1 Kimathi Avenue, Kampala
 La-Cedri Forex Bureau 1 - Grand Imperial Hotel, 616A Nile Avenue, Kampala
 La-Cedri Forex Bureau 2 - Dr. Ahamad Building, 3 Entebbe Road, Kampala
 La-Cedri Forex Bureau 3 - Teddy's Shop & Apartment Building, Floor#2, Shop#K72, 4 Dastur Street, Kampala
 La-Cedri Forex Bureau 3 - Abamwe House, 20 Nabugabo Road, Kampala
 Lloyds Forex Bureau 1 - 1 Entebbe Road, Kampala
 Lloyds Forex Bureau 2 - Shop#GF24, Lugogo Forest Mall, 3A2&3A3 Sports Lane, Kampala
 Lloyds Forex Bureau 3 - Shop#M3, Floor#1, Energy Centre, 9 Market Street, Kampala
 Lloyds Forex Bureau 3 - 43-44 Nabugabo Road, Kampala
 Matrix Forex Bureau - Eagen House, 2 Entebbe Road, Kampala
 MBM Forex Bureau - Hotel Equatorial Shopping Arcade, 37-39 William Street, Kampala
 Mercury Forex Bureau - Room D06, Arrow Complex, 56-58 Ben Kiwanuka Street, Kampala
 Metropolitan Forex Bureau 1 - Garden City Mall, 64-86 Yusuf Lule Road, Kampala
 Metropolitan Forex Bureau 2 - Grand Imperial Hotel Shopping Mall, 6-6A Nile Avenue, Kampala
 Metropolitan Forex Bureau 3 - Cham Towers, 20 Kampala Road, Kampala
 Metropolitan Forex Bureau 4 - Oasis Mall, 88-94 Yusuf Lule Road, Kampala
 Metropolitan Forex Bureau 5 - Metropole House, 8-10 Entebbe Road, Kampala
 Metropolitan Forex Bureau 6 - Shoprite Shopping Mall,1-3-5 Ben Kiwanuka Street, Kampala
 Micah Forex Bureau - Jjemba Plaza, 26 Luwum Street, Kampala
 Midland Forex Bureau - 30 Ben Kiwanuka Street, Kampala
 Mid-West Forex Bureau 1A - Arua Park Plaza, 76 Ben Kiwanuka Street, Kampala
 Mid-West Forex Bureau 1B - Kati Kati Building, 27 William Street, Kampala
 Mihasesu Forex Bureau - Ivory Plaza Building, 4 Wilson Road, Kampala
 Modern Forex Bureau - Prime Shopping Complex, 6 Johnstone Street, Kampala
 Moha Forex Bureau - Jesco Plaza, Room#CB02, Kampala
 Monex Forex Bureau - Prime Shopping Complex, 6 Johnstone Street, Kampala
 [[money Bag Exchange Bureau Ltd, Plot 1446 Muganzirwazza Building katwe, kampala   
 MoneyLand Forex Bureau - City Center Shopping Complex, 12 Luwum Street, Kampala
 Money Point Forex Bureau - Main Post Office Building, 35 Kampala Road, Kampala
 Muna Forex Bureau - 39B High Street, Mbarara
 Mungwe Forex Bureau - Atlanta Textiles Building, 5 Nakivubo Mews, Kampala
 Mutukula Forex Bureau Ltd- URA Warehouse Building Ground Floor Rm1,Mutukula Border Post, MUTUKULA UGANDA.
 Mustaqbal Express Forex Bureau - Prime Shopping Complex, 6 Johnstone Street, Kampala
 New Age Forex Bureau - EM Plaza, 80 Kampala Road, Kampala
 Nok Forex Bureau - Shumuk House, 2 Colville Street, Kampala
 Noor Forex Bureau - Jafaari Kibirige Building, 7 Luwum Street, Kampala
 Norfax Forex Bureau 1A - Passenger Terminal Building, Entebbe International Airport, Entebbe
 Norfrax Forex Bureau 1B - Departures Lounge, Entebbe International Airport, Entebbe
 Novo Forex Bureau - 3-5 Bazaar Street, Tororo
 Odaa Forex Bureau 1A - Kati Kati House, 27 William Street, Kampala
 Odaa Forex Bureau 1B - 27 Ben Kiwanuka Street, Kampala
 Olompic Forex Bureau - King Fahd Plaza, 52 Kampala Road, Kampala
 Omni Forex Bureau - Majestic Plaza, 22 William Street, Kampala
 PM Forex Bureau - 14 Rashid Khamis Road, Old Kampala, Kampala
 Pacific Forex Bureau 1 - King Fahd Plaza, Second Floor, Shop#20, 52 Kampala Road, Kampala
 Pacific Forex Bureau 2 - Rose Anek Memorial House, 26 Andrea Olal Road, Gulu
 Pakasa Forex Bureau 1A - 69 Spring Road, Bugoloobi, Kampala
 Pakasa Forex Bureau 1B - 4-10 Muyenga Road, Kabalagala, Kampala
 Passion Forex Bureau - First Floor, Sekaziga House, Room#17, 12-37 Nakivubo Mews. Kampala
 Pay Uganda Forex Bureau Limited - Kampala Boulevard, First Floor Room#F01, 24/26 Kampala Road, Kampala
 Peniel Forex Bureau - Yamaha Building, 34 Luwum Street, Kampala
 Prime Forex Bureau 1A - 9 Kampala Road, Kampala
 Prime Forex Bureau 1B - Central Shopping Plaza, 17 Market Street, Kampala
 Queen Forex Bureau - King Fahd Plaza, 52 Kampala Road, Kampala
 Quick Exchange Forex Bureau - Superior Shopping Complex, 12 Johnstone Street, Kampala
 Red Concepts Forex Bureau - Hoima Shopping Arcade, 11 Wright Road, Hoima
 Red Fox Forex Bureau - 54 Kampala Road, Kampala
 Reliance Forex Bureau - People's Plaza, 17 Johnstone Street, Kampala
 Rich Vault Forex Bureau - 3 Cooper Road, Kisementi, Kololo, Kampala
 Rock City Forex Bureau - 2 Pilkington Road, Kampala
 Rolis Forex Bureau - Superior Shopping Complex, 12 Johnstone Street, Kampala
 Rolltex International Forex Bureau - City Central Complex, 12 Luwum Street, Kampala
 Royal Cash Point Forex Bureau - Royal Complex Building, 16A Market Street, Kampala
 S&A Forex Bureau - Mukwano Arcade, Ben Kiwanuka Street, Kampala
 Sayona Forex Bureau - Shop#51, People's Plaza, 17 Ben Kiwanuka Street, Kampala
 Sawa Express Forex Bureau and Money Transfer - opposite Hass Petrol Arua#,Concord Building, Ground floor Room A105 , Arua
 Shalom Forex Bureau - 11 Portal Avenue, Kampala
 Shumuk Forex Bureau 1 - 5 Arua Street, Arua
 Shumuk Forex Bureau 2 - Grand Imperial Hotel, 6 Nile Avenue, Kampala
 Shamuk Forex Bureau 2 - Pioneer Mall, 2 Johnstone Street, Kampala
 Shumuk Forex Bureau 4 - Imperial Royale Hotel, 7 Kintu Road, Kampala
 Shumuk Forex Bureau 5 - Shumuk House, 2 Colville Street, Kampala
 Simba Forex Bureau - 50 Kampala Road, Kampala
 Siyar Forex Bureau - Superior Shopping Complex, 12v Johnstone Street, Kampala
 Sky Forex Bureau 1A - Mabiriizi Plaza, 47 Kampala Road, Kampala
 Sky Forex Bureau 1B - Grand Corner House, Level 4, Shop#303-304, 48 Ben Kiwanuka Street, Kampala
 Speed Bird Forex Bureau - Shop#3, Kampala Sheraton Hotel Shopping Arcade, Kampala
 Spot Cash Forex Bureau 1 - 17 Ben Kiwanuka Street, Kampala
 Spot Cash Forex Bureau 2 -, Rooms#GF14 & GF15, Sunset Arcade, 17 Wilson Road, Kampala
 Spring Forex Bureau 1A - Impala House, 13 Kimathi Avenue, Kampala
 Spring Forex Bureau 1B - Ginkas Plaza, 10 Johnstone Street, Kampala
 Ssemanda Forex Bureau - 7 Nakivubo Lane, Kampala
 Stanhope Forex Bureau 1 - Uganda House, 8-10 Kampala Road, Kampala
 Stanhope Forex Bureau 2 - 18 Nakivubo Road, Kampala
 Stanhope Forex Bureau 3 - 40 Kampala Road, Kampala
 Sun Forex Bureau - Amber House, 29-33 Kampala Road, Kampala
 Super Gate Forex Bureau - Mabiriizi Complex, 47 Kampala Road, Kampala 
 Superior Exchange Forex Bureau 1A - Twese Plaza, 14 Wilson Street, Kampala
 Superior Exchange Forex Bureau 1B - 9 Luwum Street, Kampala
 Supreme Forex Bureau - Colline House, 4 Pilkington Road, Kampala
 Tal Forex Bureau - 10 Johnstone Street, Kampala
 Tick Forex Bureau - Shop#D73, Central Plaza, 17 Market Street, Kampala
 Top In Town Forex Bureau - Shop#CD17, Jesco Plaza, 10 Wilson Road, Kampala
 Transcash Forex Bureau - Energy Centre Building, 16 Market Street, Kampala
 Trend Forex Bureau - 3 Main Street, Jinja
 Tzars Forex Bureau - 944 Ggaba Road, Kansanga, Kampala
 UAE Exchange Bureau 1A - Amber House, 29-33 Kampala Road, Kampala
 UAE Exchange Bureau 1B - 17 Lugogo Shoprite Mall, Kampala
 UAE Exchange Bureau 1C - Transnile Building, 10 Johnstone Street, Kampala
 Uganda City Forex Finance Limited - Jumbo Arcade, 9 Nakivubo Road, Kampala
 Ultimate Forex Bureau - Zainabu Aziza Emporium, 4 Snay Bin Amir Street, Kampala
 Umoja Forex Bureau 1 - Energy Centre Building, 16 Market Street, Kampala
 Umoja Forex Bureau 2 - 17 Awich Road, Gulu
 Unitrust Forex Bureau - Shop#L14, MM Plaza, 5 Luwum Street, Kampala
 Vaya Forex Bureau 1 - Kalungi Commercial Center, 48 Kampala Road, Kampala
 Vaya Forex Bureau 2 - 2 Luwum Street, Kampala
 Victoria Forex Bureau - 16-18 Luwum Street, Kampala
 Walk-In Forex Bureau - 22 Burton Street, Kampala
 Wall Street Way Bureau - Prime Shopping Complex, 6 Johnson Street, Kampala
 Westlink Forex Bureau - Mukwano Shopping Arcade, 22 Luwum Street, Kampala
 XPAP Forex Bureau - Shop#GF03, 30 Airport Road,  Entebbe
 Zain Forex Bureau - Ntinda Shopping Center, 1 Kimera Road, Ntinda, Kampala
 Zain Forex Bureau - Ntinda Shopping Center, 1 Kimera Road, Ntinda, Kampala
 Zion Forex Bureau - Mabirizi Complex Basement,Kampala road,  Kampala

 X Forex Bureau 1, 2, 3 etc..: Denotes institutions with same names but with separate registrations and licenses.
 Y Forex Bureau 1A, 1B, 1C etc...: Denotes institutions with multiple branches but with one registration.

Concentration
Only 28 or 12.5 percent of the foreign exchange bureaus are located outside Kampala. The other 198 or 87.6 percent are located within Kampala, the capital, or in its suburbs.

See also
 List of banks in Uganda
 Banking in Uganda

Reference
*https://t.me/ShaneBinaryandForextry/12

External links
https://t.me/ShaneBinaryandForextry/12
Foreign Exchange Tables At Oanda.com
How To Find The Best Forex Exchange Rates In Uganda

Financial services companies of Uganda
Forex
Uganda